Tatlembetovo (Tätlembät) is a rural locality (a village) in Mansurovsky Selsoviet, Uchalinsky District, Bashkortostan, Russia. The population was 22 as of 2010. There are 2 streets.

Geography 
Tatlembetovo is located 48 km north of Uchaly (the district's administrative centre) by road. Absalyamovo is the nearest rural locality.

References 

Rural localities in Uchalinsky District